Hubert's Hair-Raising Adventure is the first picture book published by author Bill Peet. It features a vain lion who loses his mane in a fire, and his adventures trying to get his hair to grow back quickly. It was published in 1959 by Houghton Mifflin Co., Boston. Peet wrote the book while he was still working as a storyboard artist at Walt Disney Animation Studios.

References
1959 children's books
Books by Bill Peet
Picture books by Bill Peet
American children's books
American picture books
Books about lions